Rodger Mutale (born 9 November 1998) is a Zambian professional footballer who has played for zambia and the youth Zambian national teams.

Career
Kamuzati began playing football as a defender in the Zambian league, eventually becoming captain of Red Arrows F.C. In 2006, he joined Malaysia Super League side Perlis FA.

Kamuzati played for the Zambia national football team in the 2003 COSAFA Cup, where Zambia were defeated in the semi-final.

References

External links

1984 births
Living people
Zambian footballers
Zambia international footballers
Perlis FA players
Red Arrows F.C. players
Association footballers not categorized by position